The inner end of the external acoustic meatus is closed, in the recent state, by the tympanic membrane; the upper limit of its outer orifice is formed by the posterior root of the zygomatic process, immediately below which there is sometimes seen a small spine, the suprameatal spine also called the spine of Henle, situated at the upper and posterior part of the orifice.

References

External links
 

Bones of the head and neck